The Commerce and Transport Union (HTV) was a trade union representing workers in the distribution industry in Austria.

The union was founded in 1945 by the Austrian Trade Union Federation.  By 1998, it had only 35,715 members.  In 2006, it merged with the Railway Workers' Union and the Hotel, Catering and Personal Services Union, to form Vida.

Presidents
1945: Karl Weigl
1954: Wilhelm Svetelsky
1966: Johann Roposs
1978:
1986: Robert Zehenthofer
1990: Peter Schneider

References

Transportation trade unions
Trade unions established in 1945
Trade unions disestablished in 2006
Trade unions in Austria
1945 establishments in Austria
2006 disestablishments in Austria